= Sonya Branch =

General Counsel at the Bank of England

Sonya Branch was General Counsel at the Bank of England. She was appointed by Mark Carney in May 2015 and was responsible for all aspects of the Bank's legal Directorate.

== Awards ==
- 2007 Professions Woman of the Future
- Global Competition Review Women in Antitrust 2013
- 2016 Hot 100
- 2019 and 2021 GC Powerlist.
- Inside Out Awards: Executive Sponsor Award for the Bank's Mental Health Network (nominee)
- Bank of England LD – In House Team of the Year at the Legal Business Awards
- Bank of England MHN: "Employee Network of the Year" at the This Can Happen award (nominee)
